Józefów is a village in the administrative district of Gmina Nieporęt, within Legionowo County, Masovian Voivodeship, in east-central Poland.

The village has a parish church,  Parafia pw. Najświętszej Maryi Panny Królowej w Józefowie k. Legionowa, built in 1997–2004.

External links 
 The parish church (in Polish)

References 

Villages in Legionowo County